|}

Urho Karhumäki (June 7, 1891, Multia – February 26, 1947, Vihti) was a Finnish poet. In 1936 he won a gold medal in the art competitions of the Olympic Games for his "Avoveteen" ("Into free water").

Some works
Syöttöpaikassa, 1929
Kymi nousee, 1930
Herpmanin pojat, 1931
Kerhoista ja kotoa, 1931
Juoksijan rata, 1932
Korpiherra, 1932
Hiihtäjän latu, 1933
Ukkonen uhkaa, 1934
Elämännälkä, 1935
Tuli ja leimaus, 1935
Vorttuuna ja Tiapolo, 1935
Avoveteen, 1936
Elämän kouluun, 1936
A.I.V.-rehua, 1938
Testamentti, 1938
Yli rajan, 1938
Työ Suomen Hyväks', 1939
Tunturille, 1940
Miesten matkassa, 1941
Voittajana maaliin, 1942
Rantasuon raivaajat, 1943
Terve sielu terveessä ruumiissa, 1944
Viulu ja posetiivi, 1944
Kylä järven rannalla, 1945
Valitut teokset, 1960

References

Sources
Biography in Biographykeskus
Suomen elämäkerrasto. Helsinki, 1955. page 373. Ilmari Heikinheimo

External links
 
 Kansallisbiografia

1891 births
1947 deaths
Finnish male poets
Olympic gold medalists in art competitions
20th-century Finnish poets
Medalists at the 1936 Summer Olympics
20th-century male writers
Olympic competitors in art competitions